The Radio Amateurs' Emergency Network, also known as RAYNET, is a British national voluntary communications service provided by amateur radio operators. It was formed in 1953 and exists to supplement national communication channels in the event of an emergency. The capitalised word RAYNET is now a registered trademark of the RAYNET-UK organisation.

History 
The idea of RAYNET came into being in the aftermath of the North Sea flood of 1953, a natural disaster that damaged the communication cables along the east coast of England on the night of 31 January 1953. With communication lines crippled, the police authorities, in desperation, sought help from the few amateur radio operators then licensed, and, although illegal at that time, the Home Office permitted the use of amateur radios to direct and co-ordinate the rescue teams. The following year, an infant network first known as RAEN was formed. The Home Office conceded the desirability of an organisation which, in times of emergency, could effect the passing of messages facilitating the rescue operations of the professional services, who themselves lacked the 'instant communications' of radio at the time. While RAEN began on a minor scale with only a few operators involved, the network has grown into a nationwide movement now known as "RAYNET".

See also 
 Amateur radio emergency communications
 Amateur Radio Emergency Service
 Radio Amateur Civil Emergency Service

References

External links 
 RAYNET official web site

Emergency management in the United Kingdom
Amateur radio emergency communications organizations
Emergency communication
Organizations established in 1953
1953 establishments in the United Kingdom
Radio organisations in the United Kingdom
Amateur radio in the United Kingdom